Emlyn Williams (15 January 1912 – 1989) was a footballer who played in the English Football League for Accrington Stanley, Barnsley, Preston North End, and guested for Stoke City during World War II.

Career statistics
Source:

References

Welsh footballers
Accrington Stanley F.C. (1891) players
Barnsley F.C. players
Preston North End F.C. players
Wrexham A.F.C. players
Stoke City F.C. wartime guest players
English Football League players
1912 births
1989 deaths
Association football defenders